Sejong High School is a public high school located in Jochiwon-eup, Sejong City, South Korea. Its former name was Jochiwon High School.

External links
 Official website

Schools in Sejong
High schools in South Korea
Educational institutions established in 1926
Boys' schools in South Korea
1926 establishments in Korea